Izatha oleariae is a species of moth in the family Oecophoridae. It is endemic to New Zealand. This species is classified as "At Risk, Naturally Uncommon" by the Department of Conservation. It is only found on the Snares Islands.

Taxonomy 
This species was first described by John S. Dugdale in 1971 using specimens collected at Station Point at the Snares Islands by Peter M. Johns. In 2010 Robert J. B. Hoare discussed this species and gave a detailed description of the same. The holotype specimen is held at the New Zealand Arthropod Collection.

Description 
Dugdale originally described the species as follows:

Distribution 
This species is endemic to New Zealand. It is only known from the subantarctic Snares Islands.

Biology and behaviour 
The larvae of this species are wood borers. Adults are on wing from November to February.

Host plants and habitat 
A host species of the larvae of this moth is Olearia lyallii. Larvae have also been collected in bark of Brachyglottis stewartiae.

Conservation Status 
This species has been classified as having the "At Risk, Naturally Uncommon" conservation status under the New Zealand Threat Classification System.

References

Oecophorinae
Moths described in 1971
Moths of New Zealand
Endemic fauna of New Zealand
Endangered biota of New Zealand
Endemic moths of New Zealand